The 3rd Mixed Aviation Corps (Serbo-Croatian: 3. mešoviti avijacijski korpus / 3. мешовити авијацијски корпус) was an aviation corps established in 1949 as 3rd Aviation Corps (Serbo-Croatian: 3. avijacijski korpus / 3. авијацијски корпус). 
It was formed by order from July 24, 1949, with command in Zagreb as join unit composed from three aviation divisions and one aviation technical division. In 1953 it was renamed in to Mixed Aviation Corps. Corps was disbanded by order from June 27, 1959, with the "Drvar" reorganization of the Air Force.

Organization
Liaison Squadron of 3rd Aviation Corps
112th Signal Battalion
379th Engineering Battalion
184th Reconnaissance Aviation Regiment (1953–1959)
275th Air Reconnaissance Regiment (1955–1959)
21st Aviation Division
32nd Aviation Division
37th Aviation Division
34th Aviation Technical Division

Commanding officers
Vlado Maletić
Viktor Bubanj

Political Commissars
Branko Borojević
Ivan Dolničar

Chiefs of Staff
Matija Petrović	
Milan Tojagić

References

Corps of Yugoslav Air Force
Military units and formations established in 1949